Adán David Ruíz Gutiérrez (born 1 February 1966) is a Mexican politician affiliated with the PRI.  he served as Deputy of the LXII Legislature of the Mexican Congress representing Baja California as replacement of Fernando Castro Trenti.

References

1966 births
Living people
Politicians from Baja California
Institutional Revolutionary Party politicians
21st-century Mexican politicians
Deputies of the LXII Legislature of Mexico
Members of the Chamber of Deputies (Mexico) for Baja California
Politicians from Monterrey